The Yamaha XJR400 was a motorcycle manufactured by Yamaha. It is a naked bike with around 53 hp (40 kilowatts). The XJR400 was built from 1990 until 2007.

External links
 

XJR400
Motorcycles introduced in 1990
Standard motorcycles